The 2016 FIL European Luge Championships took place under the auspices of the International Luge Federation at Altenberg, Germany from 13 to 14 February 2016.

Medalists

Medal table

References 

FIL European Luge Championships
FIL European Luge Championships
FIL European Luge Championships
International luge competitions hosted by Germany
Sport in Altenberg, Saxony
January 2016 sports events in Germany
2010s in Saxony